Home economics, or family and consumer sciences, is a subject taught in many secondary schools.

Home Economics may also refer to:

 Home Economics (TV series), a 2021 American sitcom
 "Home Economics" (Community), a 2009 television episode

See also
 "Home-Ec" (Roseanne), a 1991 television episode
 Home Economics Building (disambiguation)
 Consumer economics, a branch of microeconomics concerned with individual and family consumer behavior
 University of Home Economics, a women's public university in Lahore, Pakistan